Medija Castle is a castle ruin located in the southern part of the settlement of Podlipovica, west of Izlake, in the Municipality of Zagorje ob Savi, central-eastern Slovenia. The castle and its stables were destroyed by the Yugoslav Partisans during World War II. The castle chapel was later restored and now serves as a venue for plays, concerts, and other cultural events, as well as weddings.

The castle is best known as the supposed resting place of the polymath Johann Weikhard von Valvasor, whose parents' estate it was and who also spent his childhood at the castle.

Gallery

References

Castles in Upper Carniola
Municipality of Zagorje ob Savi
Ruined castles in Slovenia